Bağlıca is a Turkish place name that may refer to the following places in Turkey:

 Bağlıca, Adıyaman, a village in the District of Adıyaman, Adıyaman Province
 Bağlıca, Amasya, a village in the District of Amasya, Amasya Province
 Bağlıca, Ardanuç, a village in the District of Ardanuç, Artvin Province
 Bağlıca, Çat
 Bağlıca, Emirdağ, a village in the District of Emirdağ, Afyonkarahisar Province
 Bağlıca, Gercüş, a village in the District of Gercüş, Batman Province
 Bağlıca, İliç
 Bağlıca, Kızılcahamam, a village in the District of Kızılcahamam, Ankara Province